The Aotearoa Television Network (ATN) was the first, yet unsuccessful television station operating in the Māori language.

What would eventually become ATN started out in early 1996, when Te Māngai Pāho started looking for tenders for a trial service operating on a UHF licence in Auckland. The winner of the TMP contract, led by Puhi Rangiaho, Tawini Rangahau, Morehu McDonald, Robert Pouwhare and Tukuroirangi Morgan, was announced on March 7 and broadcasting commenced on May 1. The pilot service became regular in October, becoming a normal regional station. TMP's budget only allowed a 500-watt transmitter which resulted in weak or no signal in the ATN catchment area.

Insufficient funding and related uncertainties resulted in the closure of this pilot service in early 1997.

See also
Māori Television, a successful, bilingual service
Te Reo (TV channel), Māori Television's sister channel, entirely in Māori

References

Māori culture
Māori language
Māori organisations
Indigenous television
Television channels and stations established in 1996
Television channels and stations disestablished in 1997
Māori mass media
Defunct television channels in New Zealand